Mandla Lok Sabha constituency is one of the 29 Lok Sabha constituencies in Madhya Pradesh state in central India. This constituency is reserved for the candidates belonging to the Scheduled Tribes, it became a reserved constituency in 1957. It presently covers the entire Dindori and Mandla districts and parts of Seoni and Narsinghpur districts.

Assembly segments
Presently, since the delimitation of the parliamentary and legislative assembly constituencies in 2008, Mandla Lok Sabha constituency comprises the following eight Vidhan Sabha (Legislative Assembly) segments:

Members of Parliament

Election results

General Elections 2019

General Elections 2014

General Elections 2009

See also
 Dindori district
 Mandla district
 List of Constituencies of the Lok Sabha

References

Lok Sabha constituencies in Madhya Pradesh
Dindori district
Mandla district